Greyhills Academy High School is a Native American boarding high school (grades 9–12) in Tuba City, Arizona on the Navajo Nation. It is operated by the Western Navajo Agency, a tribal agency working in affiliation with the Bureau of Indian Education (BIE), which funds the school.

A radio station, KGHR 91.3 FM, is associated with the school.

The school has a dormitory and has boarding students.

References

External links
 Official website
 
 Information on the Western Navajo Agency
 BIE school info index – Greyhills is on page 9

Public boarding schools in the United States
Public high schools in Arizona
Educational institutions established in 1972
Native American schools in Arizona
Education on the Navajo Nation
Charter schools in Arizona
Schools in Coconino County, Arizona
Boarding schools in Arizona
Native American boarding schools